JB. Rhodes (March 2, 1865 – October 12, 1931) was an American inventor with more than 230 patents to his credit including the 1922 Vented oil bottle and Rhodes razor.

Rhodes was born on March 2, 1865, in Oshtemo Township, Kalamazoo County, Michigan.

Rhodes died in Kalamazoo, Michigan, on October 12, 1931.

References

American inventors
1865 births
1931 deaths